Mack Moore (born March 4, 1959, in Monroe, Louisiana) is a former NFL and CFL defensive lineman. He played six seasons for the BC Lions and was a CFL All-Star twice.

External links 
NFL stats

1959 births
Living people
American football defensive linemen
Canadian football defensive linemen
American players of Canadian football
BC Lions players
Miami Dolphins players
San Diego Chargers players
Texas A&M Aggies football players